Butterfingers may refer to:

Butterfinger, an American confectionery brand of Ferrero
Butterfinger (Canadian band), a Canadian alternative-rock band
Butterfingers (Australian band), an Australian hip hop group
Butterfingers (Malaysian band), a Malaysian rock band
Butter Fingers, a 1925 American film directed by Del Lord
"Butterfingers" (song), a song by Amy Pearson